The 1993 African U-17 Qualifying for World Cup was the final qualifying edition organized by the Confederation of African Football (CAF) into the FIFA U-17 World Cup. From 1995 onwards, CAF organized the African U-17 Championship. The three winners qualified to the 1993 FIFA U-17 World Championship.

Preliminary round
The winners advanced to the First Round.

|}

Senegal advanced after 4−2 on aggregate.

Mauritius advanced after the withraw of Kenya.

Guinea-Bissau advanced after the withraw of Mauritania.

First round
The winners advanced to the Final Round.

|}

Ghana advanced after 4−1 on aggregate.

Nigeria advanced after 2−0 on aggregate.

Algeria advanced after 1−0 on aggregate.

Tunisia advanced after 3−0 on aggregate.

Egypt advanced after the withraw of Uganda.

Mali advanced after the withraw of Ivory Coast.

Final round
The winners qualified for the 1993 FIFA U-17 World Championship.

|}

Ghana qualified after 5−0 on aggregate.

Nigeria qualified after 6−1 on aggregate.

Tunisia advanced on away goal after 1−1 on aggregate.

Countries to participate in 1993 FIFA U-17 World Championship
The 3 teams which qualified for 1993 FIFA U-17 World Championship.

References

External links
Details qualifying - rsssf.com

1993 in African football
African U-17 Qualifying for World Cup